Enne Njan Thedunnu is a 1983 Indian Malayalam film, directed by P. Chandrakumar and produced by P. Ramachandran. The film stars Madhu, Shubha, Sukumari and Kaviyoor Ponnamma in the lead roles. The film has musical score by A. T. Ummer.

Cast

Madhu
Shubha
Sukumari
Kaviyoor Ponnamma
Jose Prakash
Rugmini
Aranmula Ponnamma
Baby Sumathi
Kanakadurga
Kedamangalam Ali
Kuthiravattam Pappu
P. K. Abraham

Soundtrack
The music was composed by A. T. Ummer and the lyrics were written by Bichu Thirumala.

References

External links
 

1983 films
1980s Malayalam-language films
Films directed by P. Chandrakumar